Schefflera chapana is a species of plant in the family Araliaceae. It is found in China and Vietnam.

References

chapana
Vulnerable plants
Taxonomy articles created by Polbot